The 1986 Italy rugby union tour of Australia was a series of matches played between May and June 1986 in Australia by Italy national rugby union team.
The final match of the tour was the first full international test between Italy and Australia.

Results 
Scores and results list Italy's points tally first.

Italy
tour
Italy national rugby union team tours
tour
Rugby union tours of Australia